Amalie Vevle Eikeland (born 26 August 1995) is a Norwegian professional footballer who plays for FA WSL club Reading and the Norway national team.

Career

Club
On 8 August 2019, Eikeland signed for FA WSL club Reading.

International
Eikeland was selected to represent Norway at the 2019 FIFA Women's World Cup.

Career statistics

Club

International 

Scores and results list Norways's goal tally first, score column indicates score after each Norway goal.

Honours

International

Norway 
 Algarve cup: 2019

Individual
 Reading - Player of the Season: 2021–22
 Reading - Players' Player of the Season: 2021–22

References

External links
 

1995 births
Living people
Norwegian women's footballers
Norway women's international footballers
Norwegian expatriate sportspeople in England
Expatriate women's footballers in England
Women's association football forwards
Toppserien players
SK Brann Kvinner players
2019 FIFA Women's World Cup players
Reading F.C. Women players
FA Women's National League players
UEFA Women's Euro 2022 players